Arkana, Arkansas may refer to either of two locations in the U.S. state of Arkansas:

Arkana, Baxter County, Arkansas, an unincorporated community in Baxter County
Arkana, Lafayette County, Arkansas, an unincorporated community in Lafayette County